Post-maturity syndrome develops in about 20% of human pregnancies continuing past the expected dates. Ten years ago it was generally held that the postmature fetus ran some risk of dying in the uterus before the onset of labour because of degeneration and calcification of the placenta. Features of post-maturity syndrome include oligohydramnios, meconium aspiration, macrosomia and fetal problems such as dry peeling skin, overgrown nails, abundant scalp hair, visible creases on palms and soles, minimal fat deposition and skin colour become green or yellow due to meconeum staining. Post-maturity refers to any baby born after 42 weeks gestation or 294 days past the first day of the mother's last menstrual period. Less than 6 percent of all babies are born at 42 weeks or later. In most cases, continued fetal growth between 39 and 43 wk gestation results in a macrosomic infant. However, sometimes the placenta involutes, and multiple infarcts and villous degeneration cause placental insufficiency syndrome. In this syndrome, the fetus receives inadequate nutrients and oxygen from the mother, resulting in a thin (due to soft-tissue wasting), small-for-gestational-age, undernourished infant with depleted glycogen stores. Post term, the amniotic fluid volume eventually decreases, leading to oligohydramnios. Although pregnancy is said to last nine months, health care providers track pregnancy by weeks and days. The estimated delivery date, also called the estimated due date or EDD, is calculated as 40 weeks or 280 days from the first day of the last menstrual period. Only 4 percent (1 in 20) women will deliver on their due date. The terms Post-maturity or "Post-term" are both words used to describe babies born after 42 weeks. The terms "post-maturity" and "post-term" are interchangeable. As there are many definitions for prolonged pregnancy the incidence varies from 2 to 10%.When incidence is taken as delivery beyond 42 weeks it is 10%, if it is taken according to the delivered baby's weight and length it is 2%. The baby may have birth weight of 4 kg and length of 54 cm but these findings are variable, even the baby may have underweight. Post-maturity is more likely to happen when a mother has had a post-term pregnancy before. After one post-term pregnancy, the risk of a second post-term birth increases by 2 to 3 times. Other, minor risk factors include an older or obese mother, a white mother, male baby, or a family history of post-maturity. Maternal risks include obstructed labor, perennial damage, instrumental vaginal delivery, a Cesarean section, infection, and post postpartum hemorrhage. Accurate pregnancy due dates can help identify babies at risk for post-maturity. Ultrasound examinations early in pregnancy help establish more accurate dating by measurements taken of the fetus. Pregnancies complicated by gestational diabetes, hypertension, or other high-risk conditions should be managed according to guidelines for those conditions.

If there are no maternal or fetal complications, labor can be induced after assessing the favorability of the cervix and excluding cephalo-pelvic disproportions. Otherwise emergency lower segment Caesarean section (LSCS) should be made.

The syndrome was first described by Stewart H. Clifford in 1954.

References

Human pregnancy
Syndromes in females